Javier Ángel Balboa Osa (born 13 May 1985) is a former professional footballer who played as a winger, most notably for Real Madrid and Benfica.

After emerging at Real Madrid's youth system, he could never establish himself in its first team. In 2008 he signed with Benfica, being loaned several times over his contract and leaving three years later.

Balboa represented Equatorial Guinea at the 2012 and 2015 Africa Cup of Nations.

Club career

Real Madrid
Born in Madrid, Balboa arrived at Real Madrid Castilla in the summer of 2005. He eventually settled down, although he missed a part of their season due to first team duty; he still finished his first year with 32 games and one goal, in Segunda División.

After having toured with the Real Madrid first team in its Austrian tour during the 2006–07 pre-season, Balboa signed a one-year loan deal with Racing de Santander in La Liga in order to gain first team experience, after being told he was not going to be part of the former's plans by manager Fabio Capello. He was an integral part of the Cantabrian side for the season's duration, scoring in a 2–1 win at RCD Mallorca in the 88th minute, on 16 December 2006.

Balboa was praised by Capello's replacement, Bernd Schuster, upon his return from loan, and his contract was extended until 2011. During the 2007 pre-season he was played as a right and left winger, and did well in several games, scoring against FC Lokomotiv Moscow.

Balboa came on in the second half of the UEFA Champions League home match against Olympiacos F.C. on 24 October 2007 and, during injury time, scored his first goal in the competition and for Real after being set up by Robinho, in a 4–2 group stage home win. On 19 December, he scored his first goal in the Copa del Rey, in a 1–1 draw against Alicante CF for the fourth round. The previous month, he had come to blows with teammate Pepe during a training session; he was not called up for Real Madrid's next match, while the Portuguese was.

Benfica
On 25 June 2008, Balboa signed a four-year deal with S.L. Benfica for €4 million, as the Portuguese club was managed by Quique Sánchez Flores. He made 17 competitive appearances in his first season, being ousted from the squad in the second following a wages dispute.

On 28 January 2010, Balboa was loaned to FC Cartagena in the second level until the end of the campaign. Returning to Benfica, he found himself limited to training with the first team, and subsequently joined Albacete Balompié on a five-month loan.

Beira-Mar
On 13 August 2011, Balboa terminated his contract with Benfica. Two days later he signed with S.C. Beira-Mar also in Portugal's Primeira Liga, leaving on 21 June 2013 after the Aveiro team's relegation.

Later years
On 16 September 2015, after two seasons with G.D. Estoril Praia, Balboa moved to Saudi Arabia after agreeing to a one-year deal with Al-Faisaly FC. On 25 January 2017 he moved clubs and countries again, joining Trikala F.C. in the Football League (Greece).

International career
Balboa made his debut with Equatorial Guinea on 2 June 2007, in a 0–2 loss to Rwanda for the 2008 Africa Cup of Nations qualifying stage. Also, he appeared in B games against the Region of Murcia and Extremadura in 2007, against Brittany on 2 June 2011 and against French side FC Issy-les-Moulineaux.

On 21 January 2012, Balboa scored the inaugural goal in the 2012 Africa Cup of Nations, the game's only as the co-hosts defeated Libya. In the 2015 edition of the tournament, also hosted by his country, he won a penalty after being fouled by Gabon's Lloyd Palun, and converted it to open a 2–0 win which put Equatorial Guinea into the quarter-finals. In the last-eight encounter, against Tunisia, he converted a late penalty to tie the game at 1–1 and eventually take it to extra time, where he scored a free kick to take his country to its first ever semi-final.

Balboa missed the first penalty in the shootout of the third-place playoff lost to the DR Congo, but with three goals was the tournament's joint top scorer alongside four other players.

Personal life
Balboa came from a notable Equatorial Guinean family. His paternal great-grandfather, Abilio Balboa Arkins, was mayor of Santa Isabel (renamed Malabo) during the 1960s. Balboa Arkins' sons were also footballers: Norberto (Javier's paternal grandfather), Armando – both were killed after participating in a failed coup d'état against Francisco Macías Nguema – and Abilio Jr., the most prominent of the three who played with his national team. Turn, a daughter of Armando, formed a family in Spain with the son of Domènec Balmanya, and they had a son, Israel Balmanya, who was a professional basketball player.

Balboa had another cousin Richard Nguema, a basketball player who played with, amongst others, Real Madrid and the Equatorial Guinea national team.

Career statistics

Club

International

Scores and results list Equatorial Guinea's goal tally first, score column indicates score after each Balboa goal.

Honours
Real Madrid
La Liga: 2007–08
Supercopa de España runner-up: 2007

Benfica
Taça da Liga: 2008–09

References

External links
 
 
 
 
 
 

1985 births
Living people
Spanish sportspeople of Equatoguinean descent
Footballers from Madrid
Citizens of Equatorial Guinea through descent
Spanish footballers
Equatoguinean footballers
Association football wingers
La Liga players
Segunda División players
Tercera División players
RSD Alcalá players
Real Madrid C footballers
Real Madrid Castilla footballers
Real Madrid CF players
Racing de Santander players
FC Cartagena footballers
Albacete Balompié players
Primeira Liga players
S.L. Benfica footballers
S.C. Beira-Mar players
G.D. Estoril Praia players
Saudi Professional League players
Al-Faisaly FC players
Botola players
Football League (Greece) players
Trikala F.C. players
Qatari Second Division players
Mesaimeer SC players
Equatorial Guinea international footballers
2012 Africa Cup of Nations players
2015 Africa Cup of Nations players
Equatoguinean expatriate footballers
Spanish expatriate footballers
Expatriate footballers in Portugal
Expatriate footballers in Saudi Arabia
Expatriate footballers in Morocco
Expatriate footballers in Greece
Expatriate footballers in Qatar
Equatoguinean expatriate sportspeople in Portugal
Equatoguinean expatriate sportspeople in Saudi Arabia
Equatoguinean expatriate sportspeople in Morocco
Equatoguinean expatriate sportspeople in Greece
Equatoguinean expatriate sportspeople in Qatar
Spanish expatriate sportspeople in Portugal
Spanish expatriate sportspeople in Saudi Arabia
Spanish expatriate sportspeople in Morocco
Spanish expatriate sportspeople in Greece
Spanish expatriate sportspeople in Qatar